Abhin Shah or Abhin Galeya is a British actor. He is best known for his roles as PC Arun Ghir in the ITV series The Bill from 2008 to 2009 and Ash in the 2012 film Cleanskin.

Early life and education
Galeya grew up in Edgware. He trained at the Webber Douglas Academy of Dramatic Art.

Career
During his time at Webber, Galeya landed an ensemble role in The Ramayana Role at the Royal National Theatre in 2001 and had a couple of guest television roles. Galeya played Jay in the 2002 BBC Wales miniseries First Degree and made his film debut in the 2004 romantic comedy Wimbledon. He had a recurring role as DC Simon Tait in the second series of the ITV series Murder Investigation Team.

After appearing in a 2004 episode of The Bill, Galeya returned to play Police Constable Arun Ghir from 2008 to 2009. He appeared in the indie film The Blue Tower which went on to win the Best UK Feature award at the 2008 Raindance Film Festival. In addition, he appeared in Ronan Bennett's "Blowback", part of the BBC Two anthology on the Iraq War 10 Days to War.

In 2009, Galeya had stage roles as in the three-day Not Black and White anthology at the Tricycle Theatre and Jemal in The Container at the Young Vic.

Galeya starred as Ash in the 2012 terrorist thriller film Cleanskin alongside Sean Bean, Charlotte Rampling, James Fox, Michelle Ryan and Tuppence Middleton. Despite mixed reviews for the film as overall, Galeya received critical acclaim for his performance, with Variety calling him "consistently impressive" and Screen International attributing "the gravitas" to him and Bean.

Galeya had roles in two Christianity-related programmes as John the Baptist in the 2015 television film Killing Jesus on National Geographic and Judas in the 2017 series Jesus: His Life on the History Channel.

He went on the 2017 stage tour of Hedda Gabler. In 2019, he starred in the West End and Old Vic revival of The American Clock.

Galeya has roles in the 2020 Finnish series Peacemaker and the 2021 Norwegian series Bortført. He played Archbishop Thomas Cranmer in the Channel 5 three-part thriller drama Anne Boleyn.

Filmography

Film

Television

Video games

Stage

References

External links
 

Living people
Alumni of the Webber Douglas Academy of Dramatic Art
British male actors of Indian descent
British male television actors
British male film actors
English people of Indian descent
People from Edgware
Year of birth missing (living people)